WSBS-TV (channel 22) is a television station licensed to Key West, Florida, United States, serving as the flagship station of the Spanish-language network Mega TV. Owned and operated by Spanish Broadcasting System, the station maintains studios on Northwest 77th Avenue in Miami, and its transmitter is located on Bahama and Simonton Streets in Key West.

WSBS-CD (channel 19) in Miami operates as a low-power, Class A translator of WSBS-TV.

History
The station was originally licensed as WYDH on October 2, 1989; the calls were changed to WEYS on October 11, 1989, and the station itself first signed on the air in June 1993. WSBS-TV has had numerous callsign changes over the years. This has caused much confusion, both among viewers and writers. In many places, the station is still referred to as WEYS TeleNoticias, and WDLP Licensing, Inc. remained the licensee for several months after the call change to WSBS-TV. Some of these calls have been reused by low-power repeater stations, themselves often subject to similar callsign shuffles (for instance, the WDLP callsign is currently used by a repeater for rival WGEN-TV). On April 4, 2003, the station changed its call letters to WGEN-TV; it was then changed to WDLP-TV on November 24 of that year. The current WSBS-TV call letters were first adopted on July 1, 2004, before reverting to the WDLP-TV callsign on September 28, 2004. Prior to 2005, the station was co-owned with another Key West station, WGEN-TV, under the ownership of Sonia Broadcasting.

On March 1, 2006, the station became a charter station of Mega TV when the network was launched, and changed its callsign back to the previous WSBS-TV letters. Its original slate of programming includes productions aimed at young Hispanic viewers. Mega TV's format follows a very similar pattern traced by rival Telemundo station WSCV (channel 51) and Univision station WLTV (channel 23) decades earlier: by creating its own television personalities.

Technical information

Subchannels
The station's digital signal is multiplexed:

Analog-to-digital conversion
WSBS-TV ended programming on its analog signal, on UHF channel 22, on June 12, 2009, the official date in which full-power television stations in the United States transitioned from analog to digital broadcasts under federal mandate. The station's digital signal continued to broadcast on its pre-transition VHF channel 3. Through the use of PSIP, digital television receivers display the station's virtual channel as its former UHF analog channel 22. WSBS is one of the only television stations in the United States to operate its digital signal on the VHF low band, which is especially rare on channels 2 to 4 (54–72 MHz), due to interference that the band is subjected to. It chose to keep this channel in the first round of the digital channel elections.

Translator

WSBS-CA (analog UHF channel 50), which lists "Miami, etc." as its city of license, flash cut its signal to digital in early 2010, and accordingly changed its callsign to WSBS-CD. This station has a Class A broadcast license, meaning that although it is low-power, it has protection from RF interference as full-power stations do. Like the main station, it uses virtual channel 22.1, as it is likely just an RF passthrough with no demodulation. Its transmitter is located in the Andover section of Miami Gardens, immediately south of the tower facility that is used by several other Miami area television stations, and has a directional antenna that aims mostly southeast and southwest, covering far northeastern Miami-Dade County, the city of Miami and far southeastern Broward County, up to just south of Fort Lauderdale.

References

External links 
 Mega TV official website
 SBS corporate website
 LaMusica.com owned by SBS

Television channels and stations established in 1993
1993 establishments in Florida
Spanish Broadcasting System stations
SBS-TV
SBS-TV
Hispanic and Latino American culture in Miami